Pultusk is an H5 ordinary chondrite meteorite which fell on 30 January 1868 in Poland. The event has been known as the stony meteorite shower with the largest number of pieces yet recorded in history. Made up of rocky debris, it consists of pyroxene or olivine chondrules deployed in mass plagioclase, there being also kamacite.

History
Thousands of people witnessed a large fireball followed by detonations and a very large shower of small fragments falling on ice, land and houses within an area of about 127 sq km (appx. 78 sq. miles). The estimated number of fragments was 68780.

The vast majority of the fragments were small (few grams), known as Pultusk Peas. The Pultusk meteorite is the largest stony meteorite shower ever recorded.

Composition and classification
Pultusk is brecciated and contains two varieties of xenoliths embedded in a dark brecciated matrix. It is a veined and brecciated chondrite with abundant xenoliths with various degrees of recrystallisation. Petrologic type 5 xenoliths prevail, so it has been classified as H5:  an ordinary chondrite significantly thermally metamorphosed and with the contours of the chondrules frequently difficult to distinguish. The main minerals are olivine and bronzite. Kamacite, troilite and chromite are also present.

Chemical composition

The chemical elements and the respective quantity found in the Pultusk meteorite have been described as SiO2 36.44 wt%, TiO2 0.18 wt%, Al2O3 1.88 wt%, Cr2O3 0.37 wt%, FeO 9.48 wt%, MnO 0.25 wt%, MgO 23.75 wt%, CaO 1.82 wt%, Na2O 0.83 wt%, K2O 0.09 wt%, P2O5 0.22 wt%, Fe 16.02 wt%, Ni 1.61 wt%, FeS 5.97 wt%, Fe (metallic) 17.62 wt%, Ni (metallic) 9.13 wt%, Fe as iron sulfide 3.80 wt%, S as iron sulfide 2.17 wt%, total content of iron 27.19 wt%.

See also
 Glossary of meteoritics
 Sikhote-Alin (meteorite)

Gallery

Additional information

Notes

References

External links

 Museum of the Faculty of Geology of the Warsaw University: Pultusk
 Meteorites: An Introduction, on Google Books
 

Meteorites found in Poland
1868 in Poland
1860s in science
1868 in the Russian Empire
January 1868 events